The buttered toast phenomenon is an observation that buttered toast tends to land butter-side down after it falls. It is used as an idiom representing pessimistic outlooks. Various people have attempted to determine whether there is an actual tendency for bread to fall in this fashion, with varying results.

Origins
The phenomenon is said to be an old proverb from "the north country". Written accounts can be traced to the mid-19th century. The phenomenon is often attributed to a parodic poem of James Payn from 1884:

In the past, this has often been considered just a pessimistic belief. A 1991 study by the BBC's television series Q.E.D. found that when toast is tossed into the air, it lands butter-side down just one-half of the time (as would be predicted by chance). However, several scientific studies have found that when toast is dropped from a table (as opposed to being thrown in the air), it more often falls butter-side down. A study on this subject by Robert Matthews won the Ig Nobel Prize for physics in 1996.

Explanation 
When toast falls out of one's hand, it does so at an angle, by nature of it having slipped from its previous position, then the toast rotates. Given that tables are usually between two and six feet (0.7 to 1.83 meters), there is enough time for the toast to rotate about one-half of a turn, and thus lands upside down relative to its original position. Since the original position is usually butter-side up, the toast lands butter-side down. Also, if the toast travels horizontally at over 3.6 miles per hour (1.6 m/s), the toast will not rotate enough to land butter-side down. In fact, the phenomenon is caused by fundamental physical constants.

Other factors
The added weight of the butter has an effect on the falling process, since the butter spreads throughout the slice. A piece of toast has inertia as it flips towards the floor, preventing its spin from stopping easily; it is usually only stopped by hitting the floor. This moment of inertia is determined by the speed at which the toast is flipping, combined with the size and mass of the toast. Because most toast is relatively uniform, they often land in a similar manner.

See also
 Buttered cat paradox
 Murphy's law
 The Butter Battle Book
 Finagle's law § Variants
 Resistentialism § Similar_concepts

References

Physical phenomena
Butter
Breads